Katarina Ruzh Carroll (nee Bošnjak)  (born 17 November 1963) is an Australian police officer and the Commissioner of the Queensland Police Service since July 2019. She is the first female commissioner of QPS. She was formerly the Commissioner of the Queensland Fire and Emergency Services from August 2015 until July 2019.

Early life and education

Carroll was born on 17 November 1963 in Innisfail, Queensland, to Bosnian Croat parents, Ivan and Antonia Bošnjak from Ljubuški and Trebižat, Bosnia and Herzegovina, and raised on a tobacco farm in Innot Hot Springs. She was educated at Mount Garnet State School, and then boarded at Mount St Bernard College, Herberton before completing an associate diploma in community welfare at James Cook University in Townsville. She also holds a Bachelor of Arts in criminology and criminal justice from Griffith University, which awarded her its Outstanding Alumnus Award in 2018.

Career

Carroll joined the Queensland Police Service in 1983, working in general duties, then as a detective in the drug squad, crime operations and ethical standards. She was awarded the Australian Police Medal in the 2008 Australia Day Honours. In 2014, Carroll served as Operations Commander for the G20 summit in Brisbane.

Carroll joined the new Queensland Fire and Emergency Services in December 2014 as acting commissioner, and was officially appointed to the role on 1 August 2015.

On 23 April 2019, Queensland Premier Annastacia Palaszczuk announced that Carroll would succeed Ian Stewart as Commissioner of Queensland Police upon Stewart's retirement in July 2019. Carroll was appointed Commissioner of the Queensland Police Service on 8 July.

In October 2019 Carroll was named one of The Australian Financial Review's 100 Women of Influence in the Public Policy category.

Honours and awards

Carroll wears the following Australian and Queensland awards and unit citations on the uniform:

See also 
 Women in law enforcement

References

1963 births
Living people
Recipients of the Australian Police Medal
James Cook University alumni
Griffith University alumni
Australian people of Bosnia and Herzegovina descent
Australian people of Croatian descent
People from Innisfail, Queensland
Commissioners of the Queensland Police
Women police officers